Antiguraleus rishworthi is an extinct species of sea snail, a marine gastropod mollusk in the family Mangeliidae.

A.G. Beu (2009) adopted Probebela for all the southern hemisphere taxa previously referred to Antiguraleus.

Description
The length of the shell attains 4.8 mm, its diameter 2.9 mm.

Distribution
This extinct marine species occurred in the North Island, New Zealand.

References

  Vella, Paul. "Tertiary Mollusca from south-east Wairarapa." Transactions of the Royal Society of New Zealand. Vol. 81. No. 4. 1954.
 Maxwell, P.A. (2009). Cenozoic Mollusca. pp. 232–254 in Gordon, D.P. (ed.) New Zealand inventory of biodiversity. Volume one. Kingdom Animalia: Radiata, Lophotrochozoa, Deuterostomia. Canterbury University Press, Christchurch.

External links
 Collections of TePapa Museum: Antiguraleus rishworti

rishworthi
Gastropods described in 1954